Serdar Yusufov (Bulgarian: Сердар Юсуфов; born 2 October 1998) is a Bulgarian footballer who plays as a midfielder.

Career

Ludogorets Razgrad
On 28 May 2017, he was called up for the first team in the First League match against Cherno More when he remained on the bench. Three days later he completed his debut, coming as a substitute in the 77th minute in the match against Lokomotiv Plovdiv.

Yusufov started the 2017-18 season in Ludogorets II playing in the first match of the season against Lokomotiv 1929 Sofia.

Career statistics

Club

References

External links
 

1998 births
Living people
Bulgarian footballers
Bulgaria youth international footballers
First Professional Football League (Bulgaria) players
Second Professional Football League (Bulgaria) players
PFC Ludogorets Razgrad II players
PFC Ludogorets Razgrad players
Association football midfielders